Bishara Merhej (born 1946) is a Lebanese journalist and politician who held various cabinet posts, including minister of interior. He also served at the Lebanese parliament in the 1990s.

Early life and education
Marhej was born in Beirut in 1946. He hails from a Greek Orthodox family. He obtained a degree in economics from the American University of Beirut.

Career
Following his graduation Merhej first worked as a teacher. Then he began to work as a journalist. He is cofounder of the Active Arab Front and joined the Al Baath Arab Socialist Party where he served in different capacities until 1973. In 1975 he involved in the establishment of the Assembly of Popular Leagues and Association which supported a united Lebanon and Arab identity of the country.

Merhej was elected to the Parliament in the elections of 1992 and 1996 representing Beirut. At the parliament he was a member of the human rights committee. On 31 October 1992 he was appointed interior minister to the first cabinet of Rafik Hariri who selected him to the post. In a reshuffle Merhej was named state minister on 2 September 1994. Merhej was the minister of state for administrative reform in the third cabinet of Hariri between 7 November 1996 and 4 December 1998.

Personal life
Merhej is married to Wali Grote, a physician, with who he has two daughters.

References

1946 births
American University of Beirut alumni
Arab Socialist Ba'ath Party – Lebanon Region politicians
Greek Orthodox Christians from Lebanon
Living people
Interior ministers of Lebanon
Lebanese journalists
Members of the Parliament of Lebanon
Politicians from Beirut
Ministers without portfolio of Lebanon
Independent politicians in Lebanon